Pamela Tiffin Wonso (October 13, 1942 – December 2, 2020) was an American film and television actress.

Early life
Tiffin was born in Oklahoma City to Stanley Wonso and Grace Irene (Tiffin) Wonso of Russian and British ancestry, but grew up in suburban Chicago, where she achieved success as a teen model. She attended Hunter College and appeared in a short film, Music of Williamsburg (1960).

Hollywood career
Tiffin was vacationing in Hollywood when she visited the Paramount Pictures lot at the age of 19. She was spotted by producer Hal B. Wallis, who had her screen tested. This led to her being cast in the film version of Summer and Smoke (1961).

She then played the daughter of James Cagney's boss in the comedy One, Two, Three (1961), directed by Billy Wilder who called her "the biggest find since Audrey Hepburn". She earned  a Golden Globe nomination for this film as well as one for Summer and Smoke.

20th Century Fox gave her the leading role in the musical State Fair (1962), a remake of an earlier film, where she was romanced by Bobby Darin and directed by José Ferrer. She was one of the three leads in MGM's comedy Come Fly with Me (1963).

Tiffin studied at Columbia and continued to model. She guest starred on The Fugitive and filmed a pilot for Fox, Three in Manhattan, that was not picked up.

She made two films with James Darren, both aimed at teen audiences: For Those Who Think Young (1964) and The Lively Set (1964). Fox put her in another remake, The Pleasure Seekers (1964), a new version of Three Coins in the Fountain.

She co-starred with Burt Lancaster in the 1965 western The Hallelujah Trail and went to Italy where she appeared in a segment of Kiss the Other Sheik (1965) with Marcello Mastroianni. She returned to make the private-detective film Harper (1966) with Paul Newman. She then performed in Dinner at Eight on Broadway.

Italy

In 1967, Tiffin decided to move to Italy "to find out what I want". She appeared in The Almost Perfect Crime (1966) with Philippe Leroy; The Protagonists (1968); Torture Me But Kill Me with Kisses (1968), a hugely popular comedy; and The Archangel (1969) with Vittorio Gassman.

The February 1969 issue of Playboy did a photo feature titled "A Toast to Tiffin".

She made her first American film in two years when she played a liberal college student and the love interest to Peter Ustinov in the comedy Viva Max! (1969). She performed Uncle Vanya on stage and was in an episode of The Survivors.

Tiffin returned to Italy to appear in Cose di Cosa Nostra (1971), No One Will Notice You're Naked (1971), The Fifth Cord (aka Evil Fingers) (1971), E se per caso una mattina... (1972), Deaf Smith & Johnny Ears (1973), Kill Me, My Love! (1973) with Farley Granger, La signora è stata violentata! (1973), and Brigitte, Laura, Ursula, Monica, Raquel, Litz, Florinda, Barbara, Claudia, e Sofia le chiamo tutte... anima mia (1974). She returned to Hollywood briefly to appear in the TV movie The Last of the Powerseekers (1971).

She appeared as herself in a 2003 documentary, Abel Ferrara: Not Guilty, opposite her daughter Echo Danon.

She released a memoir, Daring: My Passages with Gail Sheehy in 2014 and a biography of her life, Pamela Tiffin: Hollywood to Rome, was written by Tom Lisanti in 2015.

Personal life
Tiffin married twice. Her first marriage was to Clay Felker, an American magazine editor, whom she married in 1962 and divorced in 1969. Her second marriage was to Edmondo Danon, a philosopher, who is a son of the Italian movie producer Marcello Danon. They married in 1974 and had two daughters, Echo and Aurora.

Tiffin died on December 2, 2020, in a Manhattan hospital, at the age of 78 from natural causes.

Awards and nominations

References

Further reading

External links

 

1942 births
2020 deaths
20th-century American actresses
Actresses from New York City
Actresses from Oklahoma City
American expatriates in Italy
American female models
American film actresses
American people of British descent
American people of Russian descent
American stage actresses
American television actresses
Hunter College alumni
Theatre World Award winners
21st-century American women